Henri de Gondi may refer to:
 Henri de Gondi (cardinal), cardinal of Retz
 Henri de Gondi, duc de Retz, nephew of the former